The Arado Ar 69 was a two-seat German beginner's school and sport biplane with an open cockpit, developed in 1933 by Arado Flugzeugwerke.

Design & development
Three prototypes were built, the Ar 69 V1 and Ar 69 V2 were powered by  Hirth HM 504A engines and the V3 was powered by a BMW Bramo Sh.14a radial engine. Featuring swept wings constructed from wood, and a welded steel tube fuselage, the V1 and V2 represented the planned Ar 69A production aircraft, and the V3 would have evolved into the Ar69B production model. No production aircraft were built, due to the success of the rival Focke-Wulf Fw 44 Stieglitz.

Specifications (Ar 69 V3)

References

Biplanes
1930s German sport aircraft
Arado aircraft
Single-engined tractor aircraft
Aircraft first flown in 1933